New Enterprise Associates (NEA) is an American-based venture capital firm. NEA focuses investment stages ranging from seed stage through growth stage across an array of industry sectors. With ~$25 billion in committed capital, NEA is one of the world's largest venture capital firms.

Description

The firm is headquartered in Menlo Park, California, and Washington, D.C., and has additional offices in Baltimore, Bangalore, Beijing, Boston, Mumbai, New York City, San Francisco and Shanghai.

Since its founding, NEA invested in nearly 1,000 companies, and realized over 650 liquidity events (with over 250 portfolio company IPOs and over 300 portfolio company acquisitions).

NEA was founded in 1977 by C. Richard (Dick) Kramlich, Chuck Newhall and Frank Bonsal. Kramlich had worked with noted venture capitalist Arthur Rock beginning in 1969 and Frank Bosnal had been an investment banker at Alex. Brown & Sons where he focused on initial public offerings (IPOs) for startup companies. Chuck Newhall had previously managed an investment fund for T. Rowe Price in the 1970s. The firm was founded with offices on both the East Coast and the West Coast. Among the firm's first investments was 3Com, which NEA backed along with Mayfield Fund and Jack Melchor in 1981.

The first NEA investment fund had only $16 million of capital. The firm's second fund raised $45 million and the third fund collected $125 million of commitments from investors in 1984. The firm continued to grow steadily throughout the 1980s and early 1990s raising $900 million from 1987 through 1996 across NEA's next four funds. Beginning with NEA-8 in 1998, the firm greatly increased the size of its investment funds. NEA's tenth fund had $2.3 billion of investor commitments in 2000. After raising a more modest $1.1 billion in 2004 for the firm's eleventh fund, NEA raised $2.3 billion and $2.5 billion for its next two funds, respectively.
In 2010, NEA launched its thirteenth investment fund with $2.5 billion of investor capital, the largest since the Financial crisis of 2007–08.
In 2012, NEA closed its fourteenth investment fund with $2.6 billion of investor capital. 
In April 2015, NEA closed its fifteenth investment fund with $3.1 billion in investor capital - the largest venture capital fund ever raised. In June 2017, NEA closed its sixteenth investment fund with $3.3 billion in investor capital - again the largest venture capital fund ever raised.

In 2018, former CEO of General Electric, Jeff Immelt, joined the firm as a venture partner.

Investments
NEA has 370 portfolio companies. Some of the firm's investments include: Aerohive Networks, Alimera Sciences, Amicus Therapeutics, Antenna Software, Appian, AppSheet, Arris International, Automation Anywhere, Bloom Energy, Box, Inc., Bright Health, Built Robotics,  ByteDance, Champions Oncology, Clarifai, Cleo, Cloudflare, Clovis Oncology, Cohere, Conviva, CrowdMed, Coursera, Dandelion Energy, Databricks,  Drop, Eargo, Edmodo, Enigma, FiscalNote, Formlabs, FTX, Gen.G, Genies, Inc., Goji Electronics, GoodLeap, Goop, HackerOne, Houzz, IFTTT, Illumitex, Illusive Networks, Instabase, Konux, Lexicon Pharmaceuticals, Luminary, Luxtera, MasterClass, Moda Operandi, MongoDB, Pager, Patreon, Philo, Plaid, Raise.com, Regulus Therapeutics, Robinhood Markets, Rock Health, Smartcar, Splashtop, Tamara Mellon, The Yes, ThirdLove, Tintri, Uniphore, Upstart, Upwork, Virtru, Wheels Up, Zoomdata.

See also
Flagship Pioneering, life sciences venture capital firm

References

External links
 New Enterprise Associates (company website)

Venture capital firms of the United States
Life sciences industry
Financial services companies based in California
Companies based in Menlo Park, California
Financial services companies established in 1977
1977 establishments in California